Lucy Tripti Gomes is a Bangladeshi stage and film actress. She won Bangladesh National Film Award for Best Supporting Actress for her role in the film Uttarer Sur (2012).

Early life and background
Gomes got involved with the troupe Theatre Centre in 1995. She completed her master's in drama and dramatics from Jahangirnagar University.

Career
Gomes has been working with the theatre troupe Natya Kendra since 2000.

Works

Stage
 Aroj Charitamrita
 Bichchhu
 Mrito Manusher Chhaya
 Dalim Kumar
 Mayer Mukh
 The Servant of Two Masters

References

External links
 

Living people
Bangladeshi film actresses
Bangladeshi stage actresses
Best Supporting Actress National Film Award (Bangladesh) winners
Jahangirnagar University alumni
Year of birth missing (living people)